Waqar Ahmad Shah (6 July 1943 – 15 April 2018) was an Indian political leader in the Bahraich district.

Early life
Shah completed his early education in Bahraich, and later completed a doctoral degree from Kanpur University. In his early life, he worked as a teacher in Ameermah Primary School, an elementary school in the city Bahraich. From 1975 to 1982, Shah worked as a medical officer, practicing as a doctor in Dargah's hospital; his clinic is also situated in the city Bahraich. He has been a member of the Indian Medical Association's Bahraich Unit since 1976. Shah has also been a member of the noted City Azad Inter College, a guardian of the Red Cross Society, Bahraich, a member of the district eye relief committee, and a member of the management committee of the Maharaj Singh Inter College.

Political career
Shah's political career started when he joined the Janata Dal in 1989, where he was sent to jail for a day. In prison, he put the Janata Dal in motion. He also won an election to the Assembly for the first time. In 1993, he was elected to the Legislative Assembly of Uttar Pradesh Samajwadi Party ticket in the election of the Assembly. In 1993, he was Secretary of the Samajwadi Legislature Board. He was a member of the public accounts committee from 1993 to 1994. His second victory in the assembly elections came in 1996. From 1996 to 2003, he was the Samajwadi Party committee member in question, Chief Whip and from 1997 to 1998, the legislature board. In 2002 in the Assembly elections in successive third time on Samajwadi Party ticket, he was elected president, assembly seat Bahraich. From 2002 to 2003 he was the dean board member of the Legislative Assembly. In 2003, he was elected vice president of the Uttar Pradesh Assembly on this post May until 2004. From May 2004 to July 2004 he was also acting president of the Uttar Pradesh Assembly. In August 2004, he worked as the cabinet Minister for Labor and Employment, Uttar Pradesh Government until May 2007. In an assembly election in May 2007 Waqar Ahmad Shah was elected to the Assembly continuously 4 times for the Bahraich seat, he then worked as Samajwadi Party deputy leader of the legislature board from 2007 until 2012. In 2012, he was elected 5 consecutive times in the assembly elections in Uttar Pradesh as President of the Assembly and once again as the cabinet Minister for Labor and Employment. Waqar Ahmad Shah became seriously ill in 2014, and he was consequently removed from the cabinet of Akhilesh Yadav.

Development
Waqar Ahmad Shah was a prominent speaker on infrastructure development, especially when talking about district hospitals equipped with modern facility, medical colleges, roads, handpumps, and ecotourism.
As a Labour Minister, he ordered quick action to prosecute those forcing child labour as soon as it was reported. He worked toward children education for those rescued from child labour.

Death
Shah died on 15 April 2018 in Lucknow's Civil hospital after a long illness. He was buried in the graveyard near Azad Inter College, Bahraich.

References

External links

1943 births
2018 deaths
Samajwadi Party politicians
People from Bahraich
Janata Dal